Kim Wilson (born January 6, 1951) is an American blues singer and harmonica player. He is best known as the lead vocalist and frontman for the Fabulous Thunderbirds on two hit songs of the 1980s, "Tuff Enuff" (which was the group's only Top 40 hit) and "Wrap It Up."

Career
Wilson was born in Detroit, Michigan, in 1951, but he grew up in Goleta, California, where he sometimes went by the stage name of "Goleta Slim." He started with the blues in the late 1960s and was tutored by people like Muddy Waters, Jimmy Rogers, Eddie Taylor, Albert Collins, George "Harmonica" Smith, Luther Tucker and Pee Wee Crayton and was influenced by harmonica players such as Little Walter, James Cotton, Big Walter Horton, Slim Harpo and Lazy Lester. Before he moved to Austin, Texas, in 1974, he was the leader of the band Aces, Straights and Shuffles in Minneapolis, Minnesota; the band released one single. In Austin he formed the Fabulous Thunderbirds with guitarist Jimmie Vaughan. They became the house band at Antone's, a blues club owned by Clifford Antone.

Wilson continues to perform up to 300 concert dates per year at blues music festivals and clubs all over the world, both as leader of the Fabulous Thunderbirds and with Kim Wilson's Blues Allstars.

His powerful style of blues harp playing has been described as "loaded with the textures of a full-blown horn section."

In 2015, Wilson made a guest appearance playing the harmonica on Karen Lovely's album, Ten Miles of Bad Road.

In 2016, Wilson won a Blues Music Award in the 'Instrumentalist - Harmonica' category.

Wilson plays himself in a rare television appearance on Wiseguy, "Sleepwalk" episode, 1989.

Discography

Solo
 1993: Tigerman (Antone's)
 1994: That's Life (Antone's)
 1997: My Blues (Blue Collar)
 2001: Smokin' Joint (M.C. Records)
 2003: Looking for Trouble (M.C. Records)
 2006: My Blues Sessions: Kim's Mix, Volume I (Bluebeat)
 2017: Blues and Boogie, Vol. 1 (Severn)
 2020: Take Me Back - The Bigtone Sessions (M.C. Records)

Guest
 Ronnie Earl, Smokin'  (1983)
 Roomful of Blues, Dressed Up To Get Messed Up (1984)
 Ronnie Earl, They Call Me Mr. Earl (1984)
 Ron Levy's Wild Kingdon, Ron Levy's Wild Kingdom (1988)
 People Get Ready – A Tribute to Curtis Mayfield (1993)
 Snuff Johnson, Will The Circle Be Unbroken (Black Magic Records, 1994)
 Bonnie Raitt, Road Tested (1995)
 Kid Ramos, Kid Ramos (1999)
 James Cotton, 35th Anniversary Jam of the James Cotton Blues Band (Telarc, 2001)
 Big Jack Johnson, The Memphis Barbecue Sessions (2002)
 JW-Jones, Bogart's Bounce (guest, 2002)
 JW-Jones, My Kind of Evil (producer and guest, 2004)
 Wentus Blues Band,  Family Album  (Bluelight Records, 2004)
 Barrelhouse Chuck, Got My Eyes on You (2007)
 Omar Kent Dykes & Jimmie Vaughan, Jimmy Reed Highway (2007)
 Louisiana Red, Back to the Black Bayou (Ruf Records, 2008)
 Elvin Bishop, The Blues Rolls On (2008)
 Eric Clapton, Clapton (Reprise, 2010)
 Mark Knopfler, Privateering (2012)
 Smokin' Joe Kubek & Bnois King, Road Dog's Life (Delta Groove Productions, 2013)
 Barrelhouse Chuck, Driftin' From Town To Town (2013)
 The Robert Cray Band, 4 Nights of 40 Years (2015)
 Buddy Guy, Born to Play Guitar (2015)
 Thornetta Davis, Honest Woman (2016)
 Peter Karp, Blue Flame (2018)
 Ash Grunwald, Mojo (2019)

References

External links
 2009 Interview Bluesinlondon Magazine
 , accompanied by Gene Taylor
  Wilson's biography on the Fabulous Thunderbirds website

American blues singers
American blues harmonica players
1951 births
Living people
Harmonica blues musicians
Texas blues musicians
People from Goleta, California
Singers from California
20th-century American singers
21st-century American singers
Singers from Detroit
The Fabulous Thunderbirds members
20th-century American male singers
21st-century American male singers